NIBS Buses is a bus and coach operator in Essex, England.

History

NIBS Buses was established as a coach charter operator in 1968 by Bill and Chris Nelson as Nelson Coaches. In 1971 Beeline Coaches of Brentwood was purchased. By 1980 it operated five vehicles. In 1984 it commenced operating routes services under the Nelsons Independent Bus Services brand to Romford Market and Southend Airport. Further bus services commenced in 1986 after deregulation.

In 2006 it was rebranded NIBS Buses. In 2018 the business was purchased by Eastern Transport Holdings with 30 vehicles. The existing brand was retained. On 17 June 2019, NIBS Buses took over Ensignbus' services in Brentwood.

Fleet
In December 2019, the fleet comprised 38 vehicles.

References

External links

Bus operators in Essex
Transport companies established in 1968
1968 establishments in England